P300 may mean:
 P300 (neuroscience), a neural evoked potential component of the electroencephalogram (EEG)
 p300 (or EP300),  a transcriptional coactivator
 Nikon P300, a mid-class compact digital camera, produced by Nikon in 2011